Sant Llorenç d'Hortons is a municipality in the comarca of Alt Penedès, Barcelona, Catalonia, Spain.

References

External links
Municipal website
 Government data pages 

Municipalities in Alt Penedès